Oea or Oia was an ancient town on the island of Thera, mentioned by Ptolemy. 

Its site is located near Kamari, and some of its ruins are submarine.

References

Populated places in the ancient Aegean islands
Former populated places in Greece
Submerged places
Santorini
Ancient Greek archaeological sites in Greece
Ancient Thera